Moana Wind (born 12 December 2001) is a Fijian swimmer. She represented Fiji at the 2019 World Aquatics Championships in Gwangju, South Korea. She competed in the women's 100 metre butterfly where she did not advance to compete in the semi-finals. She also competed in the women's 100 metre breaststroke event.

In 2019, she also competed at the 2019 Pacific Games held in Samoa and she won two gold medals and two silver medals.

References 

Living people
2001 births
Place of birth missing (living people)
Fijian female swimmers
Female breaststroke swimmers
Female butterfly swimmers